Dulcima is a 1969 Canadian television film directed by Matt Segal. The film stars Jackie Burroughs as Dulcima, a carefree girl who begins working on a run-down farm in rural Ontario owned by the miserly Mr. Parker (John Colicos). The farmer quickly becomes enamoured of the pretty and lively girl and invites her to stay, but their relations become strained when he discovers her affections for a surveyor visiting from the city (Chuck Shamata).

The story was adapted from a novella of the same name by H. E. Bates, which was also later adapted into the British feature film Dulcima in 1971.

The film aired on CBC Television in 1969. At the Canadian Film Awards that year, Burroughs won the award for Best Actress in a Non-Feature, and Colicos was nominated for Best Actor in a Non-Feature.

Cast
 Jackie Burroughs as Dulcima
 John Colicos as Mr. Parker
 Chuck Shamata as Surveyor

References

1969 films
1969 drama films
CBC Television original films
Canadian drama television films
English-language Canadian films
Films based on short fiction
Films set in Ontario
1960s English-language films
1960s Canadian films